John Rodríguez  may refer to:

John Rodriguez (politician) (1937–2017), Guyanese-born Canadian politician
John Rodriguez (baseball), American baseball player
Johnny Rodriguez, American singer
Johnny Rodríguez (basketball), Puerto Rican basketball player
Johnny "Dandy" Rodríguez, American percussionist
Johnny Ray (comedian), American comedian born Johnny Ray Rodríguez
Jhon Édison Rodríguez, Colombian fencer
Johnny Rodriguez (soccer), American soccer player